Yang Cheng Tong is a contactless rechargeable stored value smartcard designed for paying the travel fares in the metro, buses, taxis and ferries in Guangzhou, China, along with most other cities in Guangdong Province, with the exception of Shenzhen. It was developed and managed by Guangzhou Yang Cheng Tong Limited, bus companies in Guangzhou, and the Guangzhou Metro.

The card is accepted by selected stores, parks, restaurants, parking meters, and in other establishments as payment. With the card holder's personal information stored in the Yang Cheng Tong, further functions can be applied, such as access control of buildings and roll call in school. The system was successfully launched on 30 December 2001. According to official statistics from its operator, there are over 5 million cards in circulation and 2.2 million transactions per day.

Yang Cheng Tong literally means Ram City Pass, since the Five Rams statue is one of the important landmarks in Guangzhou.

Type of cards 

There are different types of the Yang Cheng Tong card:
Standard card: sold for deposit value of 20RMB. Deposit will be refunded when the card is returned. Also available with China T-union standard, which can be use nationwide.
Commemorative card: available in Standard card sizes or different sizes. Deposit not included and refund of this type is prohibited.
Xeno-card: used with wearable devices through NFC or SIM cards.
Enterprise card
Joint card: co-iusses with local banks.
Tour Pass
Yang Cheng Tong QR Code: payments through QR Codes by multiple parties.

Criticism 
Compared to other contactless smartcards in use, the data transmission of Yang Cheng Tong is criticized by commuters that it takes 1~2 seconds between the card and reader to complete the transaction, though the operator claims that the data communication only takes 0.5 seconds in its official site.

An issue with the Yang Cheng Tong card is, however, that the system seems to be very old in terms of IT systems. It was first used in the late nineties of the twentieth century. That is why the card does not support fare integration with other modes of transport, e.g. when a trip is made with multiple interchanges between bus and metro, passengers will have to pay at each point of transfer from one to another mode of transport.

References

External links
 Yang Cheng Tong official website

Guangzhou
Transport in Guangdong
Contactless smart cards
Fare collection systems in China
Payment systems